Robert Shortt (born 1971) is an Irish journalist and former current affairs broadcaster. He is the RTÉ News and Current Affairs Economics Correspondent since 2019. He previously was the Business Correspondent and Washington Correspondent for RTÉ News, and worked as a reporter with RTÉ's flagship current affairs programme Prime Time.

Shortt began his journalistic career with Nihon Keizai Shimbun and BBC News before joining RTÉ in 1998, working on radio as a reporter on RTÉ News at One before being appointed RTÉ News Business Correspondent in 2001. In that role he created and co-presented The Business Programme on RTÉ Radio 1. From 2005 to 2008, Shortt was based in the United States as RTÉ's Washington correspondent. He covered stories such as Hurricane Katrina and the 2008 United States presidential election. Since returning to Ireland, he worked as a reporter on Prime Time, winning a Smurfit Business Journalist Award for his documentary on Ireland's economic collapse.

References

1971 births
Living people
RTÉ newsreaders and journalists
Alumni of University College Dublin
People educated at Presentation College, Bray